João Pedro Ferreiro Geraldo (born 29 September 1995) is a Portuguese table tennis player from Mirandela, who currently plays for German club TTF Liebherr Ochsenhausen and Greek club Panathinaikos. Together with Tiago Apolónia and Marcos Freitas, he won the gold medal in the men's team competition at the 2014 European Table Tennis Championships and at the inaugural European Games with Tiago Apolonia and Marcos Freitas.

References

Portuguese male table tennis players
1995 births
People from Mirandela
European Games gold medalists for Portugal
European Games medalists in table tennis
Living people
Table tennis players at the 2015 European Games
Sportspeople from Bragança District
Mediterranean Games silver medalists for Portugal
Mediterranean Games bronze medalists for Portugal
Mediterranean Games medalists in table tennis
Competitors at the 2022 Mediterranean Games
Panathinaikos table tennis players
21st-century Portuguese people